Nectophrynoides paulae is a species of toad in the family Bufonidae. It is endemic to the Ukaguru Mountains of Tanzania.

References

paulae
Amphibians described in 2007
Amphibians of Tanzania
Endemic fauna of Tanzania